The Lafayette Aviators are a summer collegiate baseball team based in Lafayette, Indiana. They are a member of the East Conference of the summer collegiate Prospect League. The Aviators previously played at the 3,500-seat Loeb Stadium in Columbian Park in Lafayette, which was demolished and replaced with a new ballpark that opened in May 2021.

The Aviators won their first Prospect League championship in 2017, defeating the Butler BlueSox in a best-of-3 series.

History
The Aviators franchise was originally based in Jamestown, New York, where it operated as the Jamestown Jammers during the 2015 season. The Jammers' owners, Milwaukee, Wisconsin-based MKE Sports & Entertainment, opted to move its Prospect League team to Lafayette and establish a new Jammers team in the Perfect Game Collegiate Baseball League in 2016, with distance (Jamestown was well outside the Prospect League's Midwestern footprint while the PCPBL's footprint was much closer, in Central New York) being cited as the primary reason for the move.

Prior to the 2018 season, the team was sold to National Sports Services, through its subsidiary, Lafayette Family Entertainment LLC.

The Aviators were supposed to play their 2020 season at Purdue University's Alexander Field; however, the season was suspended when Purdue closed their athletic facilities due to the COVID-19 pandemic.

The team was finally able to welcome spectators to their season opener at their new stadium on June 1, 2021.

Seasons

Roster

References 

Lafayette, Indiana
Amateur baseball teams in Indiana
Prospect League teams